Robinson Ekspeditionen 2006 (also known as Robinson: Eliten) was the ninth season of the Danish versions of the Swedish show Expedition Robinson. This season premiered on September 4, 2006 and aired until November 21, 2006. The main twist this season was that every contestant was a well-known athlete in a sport. Along with this twist, this season contestants would not be eliminated by the result of tribal council voting, but by the result of duels between two contestants from the same tribe. This means that this season following the vote at tribal council, the voted-out player would pick one of their fellow tribe member to face off with in a duel to determine which would stay in the game. Once the two tribes merged, the twist of "Utopia" returned to the game. In Utopia all eliminated players would compete in a series of duels in order to earn a spot in the final four. Nicole Sydbøge won the final duel and returned to the game. In a final twist, there was no jury this season; instead in order to keep with the athletic theme of the season the final four competed in a series of challenges in order to determine a winner. In the end, it was Diego Tur who won the season over Denise Dupont after winning the final challenge.

Finishing order

External links
http://www.bt.dk/underholdning/robinson-er-landet

Robinson Ekspeditionen seasons
Danish reality television series
2006 Danish television seasons